Mar Athanasius Memorial Higher Secondary School (MAMHSS) is a school situated in Puthencruz, Ernakulam district, Kerala. The school is affiliated with Kerala State Education Board, SCERT.

The school has been named after St. Athanasius Paulose popularly known as 'Valiya Thirumeni', who is a saint of the Syriac Orthodox Church.

Now the school functions as a part of the activities spearheaded by the Sisters of the St:Mary's Convent under the banner of St.Mary's Charitable Trust.

When the school started functioning, there were only 84 pupils on the rolls. Now there are about 1500 pupils from L.K.G to Std XII. There are 43 teaching staffs and 14 non-teaching staffs.

Recently management started Baselious Thomas Ist Catholicose Public School, a sister concern of the institution in the year 2004 following CBSE syllabus.

The late Very Rev. Thariyan Corepiscopa was the first Headmaster of the school. Late Annamma Philip, V.J. Mathew, late chev: Sri V.M. Eapen, M.P. Mathaikunju, M. Thankachan, and T.K. Peter headed the institution for different periods in succession.

There is an elected school council consisting of one representative from each class division.

History
The Schools is managed by the Malankara Jacobite Syrian Orthodox Church

Achievements
School give due importance to co-curricular activities as well. Different clubs such as Science club, I.T. club, Mathematics club, Social Science club, Health club and Nature club are also functioning in the school.
Students participated in the Sub-District Sports and Sub-District, District youth festivals and won prizes. Students participate in Quiz Competitions and Painting competitions conducted by Y.M.C.A.s and clubs of nearby places and won prizes. Vidhya-Rangam Kala-Sahithyia Vedi is also functioning in the school.

SSLC result of the school
School maintains a 100% result all these years.

External links
 School's religious affiliation

References

Christian schools in Kerala
Primary schools in Kerala
High schools and secondary schools in Kerala
Schools in Ernakulam district
Educational institutions established in 1979
1979 establishments in Kerala